was a Japanese politician born in Nagoya City in Aichi Prefecture. He is well known for falsely accusing the former Livedoor CEO Takafumi Horie of bribing the Liberal Democratic Party.

Personal life
Nagata secured a B.S. from University of Tokyo in 1993 and then entered the Ministry of Finance. In 1995, he obtained an MBA from University of California, Los Angeles (UCLA).

In November 2008, Nagata attempted suicide and was taken into police custody. On January 3, 2009, Nagata committed suicide by leaping from a high-rise apartment building in Yahatanishi-ku, Kitakyūshū, Japan.

He was suffering from bipolar disorder.

National Diet of Japan 
In 1999, he resigned from his position in the Ministry of Finance to run for the House of Representatives in Chiba Prefecture. Nagata's career in the Diet was marked by numerous embarrassing and controversial episodes.

On November 20, 2000, Diet member Kenshiro Matsunami doused Nagata with water for suggesting that he had slept with female Diet member Chikage Ogi. Nagata later claimed he had said nothing of the sort and was actually only stating that then Prime Minister Yoshirō Mori was unfit to be the leader of his country.

On April 5, 2001, he asked questions at the main session of the Diet without written notes, opening the doors for a new level of preparedness in younger politicians who do not need to follow scripts in making speeches or during hearings, unlike their older peers.

In November 2002, a convict was killed at Nagoya Prison after being blasted with a high-pressure water hose. Nagata and others tried to prove that this was not an accident and that the officers who committed the act were, indeed, negligent by conducting a similar experiment on a mannequin. However, it was later revealed that the water pressure of the hose used in the experiment was more than ten times that of what had been used at the time of the incident, and, hence, the DPJ was later forced to apologize.

On March 11, 2004, he made disparaging remarks about Keizō Obuchi, Yoshirō Mori, and Junichiro Koizumi. The ruling Liberal Democratic Party protested and his remarks were removed from the record.

In July 2005, he accused the LDP coalition party, the New Komeito Party, of illegally moving voter registrations to Tokyo in the recent metropolitan elections. Nagata had no proof and based his statements on rumor, and the DPJ apologized to the Komeito.

In a similar incident in August 2005, Nagata accused the Komeito supporter group, the Sōka Gakkai, of not registering as a religious group. The group has been registered as such since 1952, and the group brought suit against Nagata for libel later that month.

On February 16, 2006, Nagata accused in parliament former Livedoor CEO Takafumi Horie of bribing the son of Tsutomu Takebe, the Liberal Democratic Party secretary general, through consulting fees. Nagata touted an alleged email by Horie instructing Livedoor to pay Takebe's son as evidence. Democratic Party of Japan (DPJ) secretary general Seiji Maehara called for the government to investigate the matter. However, it was later revealed that the email couldn't be verified. As a result, DPJ made a formal public apology. Its top officials, including Maehara, resigned and Nagata was suspended from the party. Nagata later resigned from the National Diet.

References

1969 births
2009 deaths
Critics of Sōka Gakkai
Japanese politicians who committed suicide
Members of the House of Representatives (Japan)
People from Nagoya
People with bipolar disorder
Suicides by jumping in Japan
University of California, Los Angeles alumni
University of Tokyo alumni
21st-century Japanese politicians